This is a list of women writers who were born in Colombia or whose writings are closely associated with that country.

A
María Josefa Acevedo Sánchez (1803–1861), non-fiction writer, poet, biographer
Soledad Acosta (1833–1913), novelist, short story writer, journalist
Albalucía Ángel (born 1939), novelist, folksinger
Dorila Antommarchi (c.1850–1923), poet, one of three sisters
Elmira Antommarchi (19th century), poet
Hortensia Antommarchi (1850–1915), poet
Consuelo Araújo (1940–2001), journalist, non-fiction writer, short story writer
Helena Araújo (1934–2015), literary critic, short story writer, novelist

B
Ángela Becerra (born 1957), novelist
Piedad Bonnett (born 1951), poet, playwright, novelist
Fanny Buitrago (born 1943), novelist, playwright

D
 Margarita Diez-Colunje y Pombo (1838–1919), historian, translator, genealogist

F
Francisca Josefa de la Concepción (1671–1742), nun, autobiographer

H
Bertha Hernández Fernández (1907–1993), first lady of Colombia, non-fiction writer, works on gardening

K
Leszli Kálli, kidnapped in 1999, diarist

L
Magdalena León de Leal (born 1939), feminist writer
Orietta Lozano (born 1956), poet

M
Ana María Martínez de Nisser (1812–1872), historical writer
Olga Elena Mattei (born 1933), poet

N
Jerónima Nava y Saavedra (1669–1727), writer and Catholic religious

O
Cecilia Orozco Tascón, contemporary journalist

R
Laura Restrepo (born 1950), journalist, novelist
Teresa Román Vélez (1925–2021), cookbook writer
Amira de la Rosa (1895–1974), playwright, poet, journalist, and writer
María Teresa Ronderos (born 1959), journalist, columnist, non-fiction writer

S
Bertilda Samper Acosta (1856–1910), nun, poet
Agripina Samper Agudelo (1833–1892), poet
Carmelina Soto (1916–1994), acclaimed poet

T
Anabel Torres (born 1948), poet, translator

U
Ofelia Uribe de Acosta (1900–1988), suffragist, journalist, newspaper editor

V
Virginia Vallejo (born 1949), novelist, journalist, television presenter

References

See also
List of Colombian writers
List of women writers
List of Spanish-language authors

-
Colombian women writers, List of
Writers, List of Colombian
Women writers, List of Colombian